Senator Carpentier may refer to:

Charles F. Carpentier (1896–1964), Illinois State Senate
Donald D. Carpentier (1931–1982), Illinois State Senate

See also
Senator Carpenter (disambiguation)